All for Money is a 1923 German silent film directed by Reinhold Schünzel and starring Emil Jannings, Hermann Thimig and Dagny Servaes.

The film's sets were designed by the art director Kurt Richter.

Cast
 Emil Jannings as S. I. Rupp
 Hermann Thimig as Fred Rupp
 Dagny Servaes as Asta
 Hedwig Pauly-Winterstein as Frau von Laar
 Walter Rilla as Henry von Lauffen
 Curt Goetz as Graf Ehrhardt
 Maria Kamradek as Sissy
 Paul Biensfeldt as Kammerdiener Pitt
 Ferry Sikla as Juwelier
 Ulrich Bettac as Fred Rupp
 Ernst Stahl-Nachbaur as Direktor der Goliath-Werke
 Heinrich Schroth as Direktor der Phönix-Werke
 Reinhold Schünzel as Schieber
 Max Kronert as Nachtwächter
 Ursula Nest as Egede

References

Bibliography

External links

1923 films
Films of the Weimar Republic
Films directed by Reinhold Schünzel
German silent feature films
UFA GmbH films
German black-and-white films